The Immaculate Conception Church also known as the Catholic church in Tartu and more formally "Church of the Immaculate Conception of the Blessed Virgin Mary" is the name given to a religious building belonging to the Catholic Church, located in the city of Tartu, the second largest in Estonia.

History 
It is a structure built between 1895 and 1899. It is the only Catholic parish church in Tartu. The first stone church was laid in 1862 and was officially consecrated in 1899.

It was designed by Wilhelm Schilling and built in the neo-Gothic style. It is situated in the Veski, Jakobi, Oru and Karl August Hermann streets. Because of the diverse nationalities that make up the congregation offers not only Masses in Estonian, but also in Polish and English.

See also
Roman Catholicism in Estonia
Immaculate Conception Church (disambiguation)

References

Buildings and structures in Tartu
Roman Catholic churches completed in 1899
Churches in Tartu
19th-century Roman Catholic church buildings in Estonia
Gothic Revival church buildings in Estonia